Fernando Augusto Pereira Bueno Júnior (born 14 September 1999), simply known as Fernando, is a Brazilian footballer who plays as a left back for Athletico Paranaense.

Club career
Born in Santa Maria, Rio Grande do Sul, Fernando began his career at hometown side SE Novo Horizonte, and also played for a short period at the youth sides of Barra-SC.  In 2017, he was included as a part of the Inter de Santa Maria squad for the year's Campeonato Gaúcho Série A2, and made his senior debut in the competition.

In 2018, after short periods at Mirassol and Ferroviária, Fernando joined Chapecoense's youth categories. On 28 November 2019, after finishing his formation, he was loaned to São Luiz for the upcoming season.

On 21 January 2021, Fernando moved to Marcílio Dias also on loan. His loan was extended on 28 May, and ended the year as a starter.

Fernando returned to Chape for the 2022 campaign, and was assigned in the main squad. A first-choice, he impressed during the year, scoring once in 48 appearances overall.

On 15 January 2023, Série A side Athletico Paranaense announced the signing of Fernando, who signed a four-year deal.

Career statistics

References

1999 births
Living people
People from Santa Maria, Rio Grande do Sul
Brazilian footballers
Association football defenders
Campeonato Brasileiro Série B players
Campeonato Brasileiro Série D players
Esporte Clube Internacional players
Associação Chapecoense de Futebol players
Esporte Clube São Luiz players
Clube Náutico Marcílio Dias players
Club Athletico Paranaense players